Hermann David Salomon Corrodi (July 1844 – 30 January 1905) was an Italian painter of landscapes and orientalist scenes.

Biography

Corrodi was born in Frascati (an alternate source lists his birthplace as Zurich) and lived for many years in Rome." Corrodi studied at the Academy of St Luke under his father, Salomon Corrodi (1810–1892) and in Paris (1872).

Corrodi  received commissions for history paintings from the British royal family. He was acquainted with most of the European royalty of the time, including a friendship with Queen Victoria, and traveled widely in the Far East, including Egypt, Syria, Cyprus and Istanbul, which provided the subject matter for many of his paintings. He is the brother of Arnold Corrodi. Originally a landscape painter in the academic style, much of his work is also typical of the Orientalism style of the 19th century. In 1893 he was knighted as an Academic of Merit by the Academy of St Luke, where he had been a professor. He died in Rome on 30 January 1905.

Corrodi's work is in the Frye Art Museum in Seattle, WA, the Dahesh Museum of Art in New York, Qatar National Museum, and Museo di Roma in Trastevere.

Works

Prayer at Dusk, Venice
Campfire by the River: The Kiosk of Trajan at Philae
Fetching Water at a Fountain
Italian Fishermen By The Sea, Southern Italy
Fisherman at Rest on a Vessel in Quiet Waters
Processione A Sorrento
The Ambush
Arab Carpet Merchants
Sunset on the Nile
At the Water's Edge
Prayers at Dawn
″Ein Fischer und Meerjungfrauen in der Blauen Grotte auf Capri″

See also

 List of Orientalist artists
 Orientalism

References

External links

1884 births
1905 deaths
People from Frascati
19th-century Italian painters
Italian male painters
20th-century Italian painters
Orientalist painters
19th-century Italian male artists
20th-century Italian male artists